The Federal University of Ouro Preto (UFOP) was established on August 21, 1969 in Ouro Preto, Minas Gerais. It resulted from the merger of two century-old higher education institutions: the School of Pharmacy of Ouro Preto, founded in 1839, and the School of Mines of Ouro Preto, founded in 1876. Today is one of the most important universities of Minas Gerais and also Brazil. The university is taken as a reference throughout the country by the School of Pharmacy and Engineering.

History 

The Pharmacy School in Ouro Preto was created from the law 140 in 1839. The law was sanctioned by Jacinto Bernardo da Veiga, President of the Province of Minas Gerais. It began the pharmaceutical education in Brazil, which did not exist in colonial times.
In 1876, another institution was created in Ouro Preto: The School of Mines. It was officially inaugurated on October 12, 1876, at the request of Emperor Dom Pedro II. Its founder, Claude-Henri Gorceix scientist, described the city of Ouro Preto as the land on which they could follow the almost complete series of metamorphic rocks which form a large part of the Brazilian territory. Moreover, it said that all around the city lent themselves to useful and interesting mineralogical excursions.

On August 21, 1969, the Federal Government has incorporated the two schools located in the city, establishing the Federal University of Ouro Preto as a foundation of public law. Since then, the university has expanded with the creation of new courses in Arts, Humanities, Science and Technology areas.

Features: centres, schools and institutes  

The university has 11 academic units, distributed as follows in the order of creation:

 Pharmacy School - EF (1839)
 Department of Clinical Analysis;
 Department of Clinical Pharmacy;
School of Mines - EM (1876)
 Department of Environmental Engineering;
 Department of Department of Control and Automation;
 Department of Civil Engineering;
 Department of Geology;
 Department of Metallurgical and Materials Engineering;
 Department of Industrial Engineering, Business and Economics;
 Department of Architecture and Urbanism;
 Institute of Humanities and Social Sciences - ICHS (1979)
 Department of Education;
 Department of History;
 Department of Languages;
 Instituto of Exact and Biological Sciences - ICEB (1982);
 Department of Computing;
 Department of Statistics;
 Department of Physics;
 Department of Mathematics;
 Department of Chemistry;
 Department of Biological Sciences;
 Department of Biodiversity, Evolution and Environment;
 Instituto of Philosophy, Arts and Culture - IFAC (1994);
 Department of Arts;
 Department of Philosophy;
 Department of Music;
 School of Nutrition - ENUT (1994);
 Department of Foods;
 Department of Clinical and Social Nutrition;
 Centre of Open and Distance Education - CEAD (2003);
 Institute of Applied Social Sciences - ICSA (2008);
 Department of Economics and Management
 Department of Social Sciences and Services and Journalism;
 Institute of Exact and Applied Sciences - ICEA (2009);
 Medical School - EMED (2012);
 School of Law, Tourism and Museology - EDTM (2013)
 Department of Laws;
 Department of Tourism;
 Department of Museology;

Repúblicas 

Students UFOP have at their disposal a peculiar form of home, a model that is not seen anywhere else in Brazil. The large majority of "federal" republics (REFOP) and private (Private Homes) from the city of Ouro Preto establish a system of selection of new residents known as "The Battle".

"The Battle" consists of an evaluation period which each candidates prove their responsibility to the republic. This is necessary because the houses do not have the characteristics of a property and the university would have a very high cost to maintain them. Because of this, the residents agreed with the university's autonomy of choice for residents in return for giving flawless maintenance of the property belonging to it.

Undergraduate programs

Graduate programs

See also
Brazil University Rankings
Universities and Higher Education in Brazil

References

External links

 

Educational institutions established in 1839
1839 establishments in Brazil
Universities and colleges in Minas Gerais
Ouro Preto